Thomas Simpson (1816 - 16 March 1880) was an English architect based in Nottingham.

Career
He married Charlotte Lovett (1819-1848) in the Wesleyan Chapel, Melton Mowbray and they had the following children:
Alfred Simpson (1844-1847)
Mary Ann Simpson (1846-1939)
Charlotte Simpson (1848-1916)
He married Rebecca Goodacre (1820-1899) on 17 April 1849 in St Paul’s Church, Nottingham and they had the following child:
Arthur Herbert Simpson (1854-1933)

He represented St Mary’s Ward on the Nottingham Town Council, and later the Trent Ward. He died at his house in Baker Street, Nottingham on 16 March 1880.

Notable works

References

1816 births
1880 deaths
Architects from Nottingham